Nirajoy Tripura is an Indian politician and the former member of the Tripura Legislative Assembly. He has been a member of the Communist Party of India (Marxist) since 1967. In the 2008 Tripura Assembly election he was defeated Shyama Charan Tripura by a margin of 1101 votes.

References

1939 births

Living people

Tripuri people

Tripura politicians

Communist Party of India (Marxist) politicians

Communist Party of India (Marxist) politicians from Tripura